FlashCP is a copyright enforcement technology for the storage of electronic materials (e.g. e-books). Originally developed under the trademark "BookLocker", SanDisk acquired the technology in 2005 with the purchase of Israeli-based privately held company "MDRM".

FlashCP is primarily used on USB flash drives to provide students with storage capabilities of copyrighted material, while protecting the rights of the copyright holders. This is done through the use of Windows-based software that must be installed to use the FlashCP capability of the drive. The software interfaces with proprietary firmware in the flash drive. SanDisk manufactured a flash drive using the FlashCP technology, the 256MB Cruzer Freedom Drive.

FlashCP is also the name of an open-source computer program for writing to flash devices. It is part of the mtd-utils package, unrelated to the above, proprietary, closed source, Windows software.

References

External links 
 Texas instrument's page on mtd-utils

Digital rights management systems